Ciposia is a single-species fungal genus in the family Caliciaceae. Circumscribed by Bernhard Marbach in 2000, it contains the species Ciposia wheeleri, a corticolous (bark-dwelling) and crustose lichen. This species was originally classified in genus Buellia by Richard Harris in 1988.

According to Index Fungorum, Ciposia is not a correct name, as its publication was predated by a homonym, the plant genus Ciposia (family Myrtaceae), which was published by Brazilian botanist Alvaro Astolpho da Silveira in 1918. The earliest-published name has precedence according to the Principle of priority.

References

 

Caliciales
Monotypic Lecanoromycetes genera
Lichen genera
Taxa described in 2000